Wilkeson School is a public elementary school building in Wilkeson, Washington. Built in 1912 and still in operation, making it the oldest elementary school in Washington still in use, it was added to the National Register of Historic Places in 1976.

Description

Wilkeson School is a two-story sandstone building with a full basement. The front of the school has two entrances with columns on either side of each entrance and a central cupola. The bell tower in the cupola is covered in copper. The school is built of locally quarried sandstone.

History

The school cost $26,985 to build, financed by bonds issued by the school district. It served the first 8 grades of students.

In 1913, a student at the school sued the principal for whipping him. After two trials, the principal was acquitted. 

In 1971, the school was closed due to a levy defeat, and was leased for some time by a local church. At an unknown date, the building was reopened as a school. The school underwent internal renovations during the 2017-2018 school year.

References

External link
Official website

		
National Register of Historic Places in Pierce County, Washington
Neoclassical architecture in Washington (state)
School buildings completed in 1912
1912 establishments in Washington (state)